Dustin is an unincorporated community in Holt County, Nebraska, United States.

History
A post office was established at Dustin in the 1880s. Dustin was likely named for a settler.

References

Unincorporated communities in Holt County, Nebraska
Unincorporated communities in Nebraska